Sigrun Grau (née Ludwigs, then Wodars, born 7 November 1965) is an East German former middle distance athlete who was born Sigrun Ludwigs in Neu Kaliß, Mecklenburg-Vorpommern. She started out as a 400 m hurdler in Schwerin and finished fourth at the 1981 European Junior Championships. She then switched clubs and changed to the 800 m like her new club mate, Christine Wachtel, who would also become her closest rival.

Now competing under the name of Wodars, she won her first national title in 1986 and placed second at the European Championships in Stuttgart, behind Nadezhda Olizarenko of the Soviet Union.

In 1987, she lost seven out of eight times to Wachtel, but the race she won was the World Championships in Rome, defeating her in a close finish. The two repeated their one-two finish at the 1988 Summer Olympics in Seoul.

Wodars completed her set of titles by also winning the 1990 European Championships in Split, her last title. She divorced and took part as Sigrun Grau in the 1991 World Championships and the 1992 Olympics, reaching the semi-finals both times. She retired after the Barcelona Olympics and currently works as a physiotherapist.

References

1965 births
Living people
People from Ludwigslust-Parchim
People from Bezirk Schwerin
East German female middle-distance runners
Sportspeople from Mecklenburg-Western Pomerania
Olympic athletes of East Germany
Olympic athletes of Germany
Athletes (track and field) at the 1988 Summer Olympics
Athletes (track and field) at the 1992 Summer Olympics
World Athletics Championships medalists
European Athletics Championships medalists
Medalists at the 1988 Summer Olympics
Olympic gold medalists for East Germany
Olympic gold medalists in athletics (track and field)
Recipients of the Patriotic Order of Merit in gold
World Athletics Championships winners